Thurston County Courthouse may refer to:

First Thurston County Courthouse, Pender, Nebraska
Thurston County Courthouse (Nebraska), Pender, Nebraska
Thurston County Courthouse (Washington), Olympia, Washington